is a Japanese voice actor affiliated with MT Project. He has performed in a Shakesperean theater group since 1997 in addition to anime and video game roles.

Notable roles

Stage
 A Midsummer Night's Dream
 Henry VIII
 King John
 La historia de los Tarantos
 Macbeth
 The Comedy of Errors
 The Taming of the Shrew
 The Winter's Tale
 Timon of Athens
 Twelfth Night

Animation
 Boogiepop Phantom - Hisashi Jonouchi (2000)
 Mahōjin Guru Guru: Doki Doki Legend - Kuroku, Ziman (2000)
 Dear Boys - Mitsuru Ohara (2003-)
 Baku Tech! Bakugan - Master Odore (2012)

Video games
 Clock Tower 3 - Dennis Owen (2002)
 Final Fantasy IV (Nintendo DS) - Cecil Harvey (2007)
 Dissidia: Final Fantasy -  Cecil Harvey (2008)
Xenoblade Chronicles - Alvis (2010)
Live A Live - Streibough (2022)

External links
 Profile at MT Project 
 

1973 births
Living people
Japanese male voice actors
Actors from Chiba Prefecture